A mooring is any structure to which a vessel may be secured by means of cables, anchors, or lines.

Mooring may also refer to:
 Mooring (surname)
 Mooring (North Frisian dialect)
 Mooring (oceanography), a collection of devices connected to a wire and anchored on the sea floor
 The Mooring, a 2012 film
 The Moorings, New York, a private community

See also
 Mooring mast, a structure designed to hold airships and blimps securely in the open when they are not in flight
 Moring